See John McWhirter (disambiguation) for other people of the same name.

John G. McWhirter FRS FREng FIMA FInstP FIEE FLSW is a British mathematician and engineer in the field of signal processing. 

John McWhirter attended Newry High School. He graduated in mathematics from Queen's University Belfast in 1970, and did his PhD there in 1973 on "The Virial Theorem in Collision Theory" under Benjamin Moiseiwitsch. He started working in the Signal Processing Group at the Royal Signals and Radar Establishment, Great Malvern, in the late 1970s, and has worked there for RSRE's successor organizations, currently QinetiQ. Prof. McWhirter left QinetiQ on 31 August 2007 to take up his current post as Distinguished Research Professor in Engineering at Cardiff University.

His work has mainly been in military areas including radar, sonar and communications, recently branching into civil applications. A particular interest is "blind" signal detection in which one does not know whether a signal is present, or its nature.

Awards and honours
 1986 honorary visiting professor at Queen's University Belfast
 1988 visiting professor at Cardiff University
 1996 Elected as a Fellow of the Royal Academy of Engineering (FREng)
 1999 Elected as a Fellow of the Royal Society.
 2000 Honorary Doctorate from the Queen's University Belfast
 2002 Honorary Doctorate from the University of Edinburgh
 2003 EURASIP European Group Technical Achievement Award 

He is also a Fellow of the Institute of Physics. He is a Fellow of the Institute of Mathematics and its Applications (IMA) and in 2002/3 its president. He is also a Founding Fellow of the Learned Society of Wales.

Selected papers
 On the numerical inversion of the Laplace transform and similar Fredholm integral equations of the first kind, J G McWhirter and E R Pike,  J. Phys. A: Math. Gen. 11 1729–1745 (1978) 
 Some systolic array developments in the United Kingdom, John V. McCanny and John G. McWhirter, Computer Volume 20, Issue 7 p. 51 (1987)

References

External links
 Cardiff University page

Year of birth missing (living people)
Living people
People from Malvern, Worcestershire
Fellows of the Royal Society
Fellows of the Institution of Engineering and Technology
Fellows of the Royal Academy of Engineering
20th-century British mathematicians
21st-century British mathematicians
Alumni of Queen's University Belfast
Academics of Cardiff University
Qinetiq
Fellows of the Institute of Physics
Fellows of the Learned Society of Wales
People from Newry